Ampelophaga dolichoides, the green banded hawkmoth, is a moth of the family Sphingidae. It was described by Rudolf Felder in 1874. It is found from Nepal and Sikkim, north-eastern India, across Thailand and south-western China to Selangor, Peninsular Malaysia.

The wingspan is 80–100 mm.

The larvae feed on Vitaceae species, particularly the mature leaves. A larva found on Tetrastigma was reared on Parthenocissus inserta.

References

dolichoides
Moths described in 1874
Moths of Asia